Anton Viktorovich Koltsov (born 24 June 1973) is a Russian politician, former chairman of the government of the Vologda Oblast (2017-2022), head of the government of the occupation Zaporizhzhia Oblact Military–Civilian Administration during the Russian invasion of Ukraine.

Biography 
Koltsov was born in 1973 in Cherepovets. In 1996 he graduated from the Yaroslavl State Medical Academy, and in 2003 from Cherepovets State University.

In 2010, he received the qualification "Master of Business Administration" at the RANEPA. Graduated from the Higher School of Public Administration of the RANEPA (“School of Governors”). Previously worked in the steel industry.

In 2015–2016, he was the Director for Health, Safety and Environment at Severstal. In 2016, he was appointed First Deputy Governor of the Vologda Oblast. In 2017–2022, he was the Chairman of the Government of the Vologda Oblast.

On July 18, 2022, during the Russian invasion of Ukraine, it became known that he was appointed head of the government of the Russian occupation Civil-Military Administration of the Zaporozhye region. He is included in the US sanctions lists.

References 

Living people
1973 births
People from Cherepovets